Emi Maria (stylized as EMI MARIA; born 9 June 1987) is a Japanese Papua New Guinean R&B singer-songwriter who debuted in 2007 with the EP Between the Music.

Biography
Emi Maria was born in 1987 in Papua New Guinea. Her mother is Japanese-New Guinean, while her father is Papua New Guinean. She spent the first five years of her life in Papua New Guinea, before moving to Kobe in Japan.

She first started listening to R&B at 6 due to her sister, listening to such artists as Janet and Michael Jackson, and K-Ci & JoJo. She began writing lyrics in junior high school. By high school, she had started writing music and producing her own tracks. She participated in the MTV Star Tour, and started performing lives in the Kansai area from 2006 onwards. In 2007, she started appearing on many different Japanese urban artists' albums as a guest artist, such as Seeda and MC Moggy.

In 2007, Emi Maria released her first EP, Between the Music on Freest Inc., a label she had created for herself. Her debut single "I Gotta (Summer Kiss)" was picked as the iTunes Japan single of the week in August 2008.

She debuted as a major label artist in 2009, with the release of a digital single "One Way Love" under Victor Entertainment. During this time, she had some of her highest profile collaborations. "Luv Is..." was a song Emi Maria performed with R&B singer Jay'ed, which features on his top 10 album Musication. In December, she had her first top 10 hit, as a featured artist on Seeda's single "Wisdom", which reached number 8 on the Oricon singles charts. After the release of her first physical single in 2010, "Show Me Your Love", Emi Maria released her first major label album, Contrast.

Discography

Albums

Extended plays

Singles

As lead artist

As featured artist

Other appearances

References

External links
 Official Victor Label Site 
 Official Blog 
 Official MySpace on Myspace 
 
 
 

1987 births
Japanese-language singers
Japanese women singer-songwriters
Japanese singer-songwriters
Japanese people of Papua New Guinean descent
Japanese women pop singers
Living people
Musicians from Kobe
Papua New Guinean singers
Papua New Guinean people of Japanese descent
Papua New Guinean emigrants to Japan
21st-century Japanese singers
21st-century Japanese women singers